Selmedica is a Washington, DC corporation and an FDA registered drug and dietary supplement manufacturer.

The FDA Food and Drug Administration issued a Warning Letter to Selmedica in 2005 regarding its marketing practices.

The Better Business Bureau (BBB) reports 48 inquiries about Selmedica have been made in the last three years, 11 in the past year. All enquiries except one in 2005 are marked as settled by the BBB.

On March 24, 2008, Selmedica CEO Perry Belcher was arrested on charges of computer fraud over $10,000, imitating a licensed professional, and deceptive business practices. Officials in Shelby County, Tennessee charged that he fabricated testimonials from doctors who did not exist, fraudulently claimed FDA approval of his products, and engaged in other deceptive activities in promoting Selmedica products.
	 	
Belcher pleaded guilty in September 2008. He was given a 10-year suspended sentence and agreed to forfeit some $1 million in assets.

Notes and references

External links
Selmedica
Perry Belcher - The Arrest of an Internet Marketer

Privately held companies based in Washington, D.C.